Ernest Charles McMillan  (born February 21, 1938 in Chicago Heights, Illinois) is a retired offensive tackle who played 15 seasons in the National Football League for the St. Louis Cardinals and the Green Bay Packers. He was selected to play in the Pro Bowl four times.

McMillan attended the University of Illinois. He is the father of former Pro Bowl safety Erik McMillan, and uncle of Howard Richards, a former first-round pick of the Dallas Cowboys in 1981.

Although their surnames have different spellings, Ernie's older brother Shellie McMillon was a college basketball standout for Bradley and played in the NBA. They both attended DuSable High School in Chicago.

References

1938 births
Living people
American football offensive linemen
Green Bay Packers players
Eastern Conference Pro Bowl players
Illinois Fighting Illini football players
National Conference Pro Bowl players
People from Chicago Heights, Illinois
Players of American football from Illinois
Sportspeople from Cook County, Illinois
St. Louis Cardinals (football) players